Devineni Venkata Ramana (21 September 1960-3 June 1999), popularly known as Ramana, was an Indian politician active in several years. He was the cabinet minister of Andhra Pradesh from 1996 to 1999. He represented Nandigama Assembly constituency in Krishna district of the Indian state of Andhra Pradesh.

Early life and education 
Ramana was born in Kanchikacherla, Krishna district, Andhra Pradesh, India. 

Ramana completed his primary education in Kanchikacherla, and intermediate in V.S.R. & N.V.R. College, Tenali. While  pursuing degree in S.R.R. & C.V.R. College, Vijayawada he dropped out in second year due to personal reasons.

Personal life 
Venkata Ramana married Praneetha. He has two children Pragna and Snigdha. His brother Devineni Uma Maheswara Rao is a senior politician and also served as Andhra Pradesh water resource minister.

Positions held
 1994–1999 : Member APLA

As member of legislative assembly

 1994: Elected from Nandigama (Assembly constituency)

As minister

 1997–1999: Minister for Primary Education

References 

1960 births
1999 deaths
Telugu Desam Party politicians
People from Krishna district
20th-century Indian politicians
Members of the Andhra Pradesh Legislative Assembly